Ernst Christoph Philipp Zimmermann (18 September 1786 in Darmstadt – 24 June 1832 in Darmstadt) was a German classical philologist and theologian. He was the brother of theologian Karl Zimmermann (1803–1877).

He studied at the Darmstadt gymnasium as a pupil of historian Helfrich Bernhard Wenck, and afterwards furthered his education at the University of Giessen (1803–05). In 1805 he became a clergyman in the community of Auerbach (today a district of Bensheim), then in 1809 was named deacon in Gross-Gerau and pastor in nearby Büttelborn. In 1814 he was appointed court deacon at the Hofkirche in Darmstadt, where two years later he became a court preacher. In 1831 he attained the titles of prelate, ecclesiastical superintendent and Oberkonsistorialrat (chief consistorial councilor).

He was founder of the publications Allgemeine Kirchenzeitung (since 1822) and Allgemeine Schul-Zeitung (since 1824). A collection of his sermons at the Hofkirche in Darmstadt was published in eight volumes (1816–30).

Selected works 
 Euripidis Dramata (edition of Euripides); 4 volumes, 1808–15.
 Eusebii Pamphili Ecclesiasticae Historiae Libri Decem, 1822 part of series: Corpus Patrum Graecorum (on Eusebius' ecclesiastical history, Book X).  
 Predigten über sämmtliche Sonn- und Festtags-Evangelien des Jahres (2 volumes, 1825–27).
 Geist aus Luther's Schriften oder Concordanz der Ansichten und Urtheile des großen Reformators über die wichtigsten Gegenstände des Glaubens, der Wissenschaft und des Lebens (as co-editor) – Spirit of Martin Luther's writings or concordance on the views and judgments of the great reformer involving the most important articles of faith, science and life.
 Stimmen aus dem Reiche Gottes an und für die bewegte Zeit, 1831.
 Jahrbuch der theologischen Literatur, since 1832 (editor) – Yearbook of theological literature.

References 

1786 births
1832 deaths
Clergy from Darmstadt
University of Giessen alumni
German classical philologists
19th-century German Protestant theologians
Writers from Darmstadt